eCapital is an international provider of commercial finance services headquartered in Miami, Florida with operations in the United States, Canada, and the United Kingdom. Marius Silvasan is the current chief executive officer of the company.

In 2021, all of their subsidiaries and acquired companies were consolidated under one company, named eCapital.

History 
Steve McDonald founded the company as Global Merchant Fund Corp in 2006.

In 2017, Gerber Finance, a company that specializes in assisting importers, distributors, manufacturers, and service providers, was acquired by Global Merchant Fund Corporation.

In 2018, Paragon Financial Group was acquired by Global Merchant Fund Corporation. Paragon Financial Group specialized in accounts receivable financing, credit protection, non-recourse invoice factoring, purchase order financing, and vendor guarantees.

In 2019, Global Merchant Fund Corporation acquired Accutrac Capital, a company active in freight factoring, a sub-sector of transportation market.

In 2020, the company renamed itself as eCapital. In the same year, eCapital acquired Advantedge Commercial Finance, a UK-based specialty lender and factoring company; Bibby Financial Services; REV Financial Group, a factoring company based in Los Angeles; and Prosperity Funding, a Fort Lauderdale-based factoring company.

In November 2021, eCapital acquired Flexible Funding, payroll funding firm specializing in funding assistance for the staffing industry, and its subsidiary, InstaPay, that provides freight factoring services.

In 2022, eCapital acquired UMB Bank's accounts receivable financing division and a company called CNH Finance that was active in the healthcare sector.

Products and services
 eCapital Connect
 Invoice factoring
 Freight factoring for transportation companies
 Asset-based lending
 Lines of credit
 Payroll funding for staffing companies
 Equipment financing

References

Financial services companies based in Florida